Rabbi Nachman Shlomo Greenspan (1878 – August 1961) was a Talmudic scholar, rosh yeshiva of Etz Chaim in London, and an author of a number of works about the Torah.

Early years
Greenspan was born in the village of Lyakhovichi in the Minsk Governorate of the Russian Empire (present-day Belarus), where his father Yaakov Moshe was engaged in commerce. There he gained a reputation for his vast Talmudic knowledge and expertise while still in early youth.

Greenspan studied under the greatest rabbis of his generation, including such legendary figures as the Sfas Emes, Rabbi Meir Simcha of Dvinsk and the Ridvaz, as well as learning under and with the Avnei Nezer; Rabbi Chaim Soloveitchik; the Rogatchover Gaon; the Chofetz Chaim; and Rabbi Aharon Kotler, all world-renowned rabbinic luminaries. Rabbi Greenspan obtained semicha at the young age of eighteen, indicative of his acceptance into the highest circles of rabbinic scholarship due to his tremendous knowledge and ability.

Britain
Upon the outbreak of World War I, Rabbi Greenspan fled to Britain via Belgium with his children. His wife Beila returned to Warsaw to look after the family's restaurant business. Initially he was Rosh Yeshiva in Liverpool and later moved to Leeds to take up the position of Rosh Yeshiva there. He finally moved to the East End of London, where he assumed leadership of the Etz Chaim yeshiva. Rabbi Greenspan remained at Etz Chaim for the rest of his life, where he produced many hundreds of learned students and pupils alongside distinguished colleagues such as Rabbis Elya Lopian, Leib Gurwicz and Noson Ordman. Among his more well-known students were future Chief Rabbi Lord Jakobovits, Dayan Pinchas Toledano, Judge Leonard Gerber and Arnold J. Cohen.

Greenspan died at the age of eighty-three, and with his death Europe lost one of its primary and most exceptional Torah scholars. A large number of people attended his funeral, where he was eulogised by Chief Rabbi Israel Brodie, Rabbi Leib Gurwicz, Dayan Grosnass of the London Beth Din and Rabbi Eliezer Lopian, rosh yeshiva of Toras Emes in London.

Greenspan met Rav Kook when he just came to Britain and became his talmid.

Writing of Rabbi Greenspan in the Jewish Chronicle, Rabbi Noson Ordman described his deceased colleague as the "humblest and most well-mannered of men" despite his "scholarship and intellectual" abilities. He noted that Rabbi Greenspan's death was "a great and irreplaceable loss both to the yeshiva and Anglo-Jewry. He was... one of the outstanding... Talmudists of this generation". Rabbi Jakobovits, in deep reverence of Rabbi Greenspan, commented, "he may have been the greatest Torah scholar in England" and also noted his teacher's great modesty and knowledge of secular disciplines.

Greenspan was survived by his wife, two daughters, son and grandchildren. Although he left many Halachic and Talmudic writings, a large number of his written manuscripts were destroyed in the First World War.

Torah works
Kodshei HaGevul (London, 1930)
Pilpulah shel Torah (London, 1935)
Meleches Machsheves (London, 1955)
Meleches Machsheves - (Jerusalem, 2017)

Sources of information

References
Jewish Chronicle archival material
Obituary in Haneemon, Rabbinic journal (page 28, Hebrew)
Short biography in the book "An Introduction to Jewish Civil Law", by Arnold J. Cohen, a pupil of Rabbi Greenspan

External links
Pictures of Rabbi Greenspan as a young man and of Rabbi Greenspan's father

1878 births
1961 deaths
People from Lyakhavichy
People from Slutsky Uyezd
Belarusian Jews
Rosh yeshivas
Haredi rabbis in Europe
20th-century Russian rabbis
Emigrants from the Russian Empire to the United Kingdom
English Orthodox Jews
British people of Belarusian-Jewish descent
20th-century English rabbis